Ahmed Al-Najei (born 18 January 1995) is a Saudi Arabian professional footballer who plays as a midfielder for Pro League side Al-Hazem.

Career
Al-Najei began his career at the youth team of Al-Hilal. He joined Al-Faisaly in 2015. He signed his first professional contract with the club on 1 February 2017. On 9 September 2017, Al-Najei joined MS League side Al-Orobah on loan for the 2017–18 season. On 24 July 2018, Al-Najei signed a one-year contract with Abha. Following Abha's promotion to the Pro League, Al-Najei renewed his contract for a further year. On 19 February 2020, Al-Najei signed a three-year contract with Al-Hazem and joined the club following the conclusion of the 2019–20 season.

Career statistics

Club

Honours
Abha
MS League: 2018–19

Al-Hazem
MS League: 2020–21

References

External links 
 

1995 births
Living people
Saudi Arabian footballers
Al Hilal SFC players
Al-Faisaly FC players
Al-Orobah FC players
Abha Club players
Al-Hazem F.C. players
Saudi Professional League players
Saudi First Division League players
Association football midfielders